Dan J. Clemens (January 3, 1945 – July 22, 2019) was a Republican member of the Missouri State Senate.

Biography 
He was born in Webster County, Missouri, and educated in the schools of Marshfield, where he was an active member of Future Farmers of America. He later went to the University of Missouri, where he was elected to the Missouri Senate, and obtained a master's degree in agriculture there. He was the owner and operator of a third-generation family farm where he raised row crops.

He attended the First Baptist Church, and served on the Soil and Water District Commission, the Agriculture Advisory Commission, and a farmer representative on the James River Partnership. He also served as president of the Marshfield School Board and the Webster Electric Co-op Foundation Board, and as state corporate board member of the Missouri Farmer's Association.

He was first elected to the Missouri State Senate in 2002. Due to Missouri term limit restrictions he was ineligible to run again in 2010. He died on July 22, 2019 at the age of 74. No cause was given.

References

Official Manual, State of Missouri, 2005-2006. Jefferson City, Missouri: Secretary of State.

1945 births
2019 deaths
Republican Party Missouri state senators
People from Marshfield, Missouri
Baptists from Missouri
University of Missouri alumni
School board members in Missouri
Farmers from Missouri
21st-century American politicians
21st-century Baptists
20th-century Baptists